The Second Coming is a Christian concept regarding the return of Jesus to Earth after his first coming and his ascension to heaven about two thousand years ago. The belief is based on messianic prophecies found in the canonical gospels and is part of most Christian eschatologies. Views about the nature of Jesus' Second Coming vary among Christian denominations and among individual Christians.

A number of specific dates have been predicted for the Second Coming. This list shows the dates and details of predictions from notable groups or individuals of when Jesus was, or is, expected to return. This list also contains dates specifically predicting Jesus' Millennium, although there are several theories on when the Millennium is believed to occur in relation to the Second Coming.

Past predictions

Future predictions

See also 
 Christian eschatology
 Eschatology
 Historicist interpretations of the Book of Revelation
 Legends surrounding the papacy
 List of people claimed to be Jesus
 List of dates predicted for apocalyptic events
 Prophecy of the Popes
 Religious views of Isaac Newton
 Unfulfilled Christian religious predictions

References 

Christian eschatology
Christianity-related controversies